Nebraska Highway 31 is a highway in Nebraska.  The southern terminus is near Louisville at an intersection with Nebraska Highway 50.  The northern terminus is near Kennard at an intersection with U.S. Highway 30.  The highway serves as a main north–south highway in the western portion of the Omaha Metro Area.

Route description
Nebraska Highway 31 begins just north of Louisville at Nebraska Highway 50.  It goes west on an alignment which lies just north of the Platte River.  After five and a half miles, NE 31 comes to the entrance of Schramm Park State Recreation Area, after which, it turns north.  Just south of Interstate 80, NE 31 becomes a divided highway.  After crossing I-80, NE 31 meets U.S. Highway 6 and the two highways begin an overlap.

NE 31 and US 6 continue north into Gretna, where the divided highway ends.  At Gretna, NE 31 and US 6 meet Nebraska Highway 370.  They continue north and become divided highway again.  Near the Elkhorn neighborhood of Omaha, NE 31 and US 6 meet U.S. Highway 275 and Nebraska Highway 92, which is West Center Road.  Two miles later, they separate at an intersection in which they also meet Nebraska Link 28B, which is West Dodge Road.

NE 31 continues through Elkhorn, and then meets Nebraska Highway 64.  It continues north and then meets Nebraska Highway 36 and ends at an intersection southwest of Kennard with U.S. Highway 30.

Major intersections

Points of interest
Schramm Park State Recreation Area
Nebraska Crossing Factory Outlet

References

External links

Nebraska Highways 31 to 60

031
Transportation in Omaha, Nebraska
Transportation in Sarpy County, Nebraska
Transportation in Douglas County, Nebraska
Transportation in Washington County, Nebraska